The 88th Belmont Stakes was an American Grade I stakes Thoroughbred horse race held at Belmont Park in Elmont, New York on June 11, 1949. From the fourteen starters, Capot won the race under a ride much praised in the media by future Hall of Fame jockey Ted Atkinson.  While Capot had won the Preakness Stakes, there was no Triple Crown at stake as second-place finisher Ponder had won the Kentucky Derby.

The 1949 Belmont Stakes carried a gross purse of $91,500 which went to the first four finishers with the nominator of each of the top three horses receiving $2000, $1,000, and $500, respectively.

 Winning breeder: Greentree Stud, Inc.

References 

Flat horse races for three-year-olds
Belmont Stakes races
Belmont Stakes